The 2016 German FIM Speedway Grand Prix was the eighth race of the 2016 Speedway Grand Prix season. It took place on 10 September at the Bergring Arena in Teterow, Germany. It was the 200th Speedway Grand Prix staged.

Riders 
The Speedway Grand Prix Commission nominated Martin Smolinski as the wild card, and Tobias Kroner and Kai Huckenbeck both as Track Reserves. It was also Chris Harris' 100th Grand Prix of his career.

Results 
The Grand Prix was won by Jason Doyle, who beat Bartosz Zmarzlik, Greg Hancock and Niels-Kristian Iversen in the final. As a result, Doyle closed the lead on Hancock in the world championship standings to five points, with defending world champion Tai Woffinden, who was eliminated in the semi-finals, sitting eight points further back in third.

Heat details

The intermediate classification

References

See also 
 motorcycle speedway

Germany
Speedway Grand Prix
Speedway Grand Prix of Germany